One is the fifth studio album of the Japanese boy band Arashi. The album was released on August 3, 2005 in Japan in two editions: a limited CD+DVD version and a regular CD version. It was released digitally on February 7, 2020.

Content
One album is the group's first album to contain officially recorded solo songs of each member. The album contains the single "Sakura Sake", which was used for the commercial of Jōnan Kōko featuring member Sho Sakurai as the spokesperson. The regular edition contains a bonus track, while the limited edition contains a DVD and a 32-page booklet.

Track listing

Chart positions

Certifications

Release history

References

External links
 Product information 
 Oricon profile 

Arashi albums
2005 albums
J Storm albums